Maria Teresa Luengo (born 25 November 1940) is an Argentine composer and musicologist.

Life
Luengo was born in Quilmes, Buenos Aires, Argentina, and graduated from the Pontifical Catholic University of Argentina in Buenos Aires in 1969, where she studied with Alberto Ginastera, Luis Gianneo, Juan Francisco Giacobbe, Roberto Caamaño and Gerardo Gandini. In 1973 she was awarded a scholarship that allowed her to continue her studies in electro-acoustic music with Francisco Krópfl, Gerardo Gandini, Femando Von Reichenbach, Gabriel Bmcyc, and Peter Maxwell Davies at the Center of Art and Communication (CAYC). During this time she was invited to participate in a year-long seminar on contemporary music during which she composed The Book of Mirrors.

From 1974 to 1975 she taught at the University of El Salvador, and in 1984 began teaching composition at the National University of La Plata. From 1972 to 1993, she also taught at the Municipal School of Fine Arts Carlos Morel of Quilmes. In 1990 she designed the curriculum for study in Electroacoustic Music at the National University of Quilmes and worked as director and professor of composition within the program.

Honors and awards
First prize in Composition from Musical Promotions, 1971 
First prize in Composition from the City of Buenos Aires, 1973 
Scholarship in Composition from the National Fund of the Arts 
Prize in Composition from the National University of La Plata, 1983 
Special Mention from the National Fund of the Arts in the Juan Carlos Peace Competition
The Fund National of the Arts recognition for composers under thirty-five years, 1988
Her work Presences was selected and interpreted in the third conference of Contemporary Latin American Music Composers, 1989 
Her music for the film Taumanía from the filmmaker Pablo Delfini on the Tau Ricardo drawings won First Prize of the National Endowment for the Arts, 1987.

Works
Selected works include:
Sonata for Piano, 1965
Heptatonic for flute, clarinet, string quartet and piano, 1970
Six Preludes for String Quartet, 1968 
Scopes for string quartet and piano, 1971
Duetto, for violin and piano, 1972
Cuatro Soles for flute, oboe, cello, piano and percussion, 1973
Absolum electronic work, about 1973
The Imaginary Museum, for violin, viola, cello, piano and instruments of persecution, 1975
Mailenanas three pieces for piano, 1976
The Book of Mirrors, stopped flute, clarinet, violin, viola, cello, piano and percussion, 1976
Six magical images, for flute, clarinet, cello and percussion, 1978
Presences, trio for flute, violin and piano, 1980
Navigator for piano and six percussionists, 1983
Nao for wind quintet, 1983
Echoes of Tupac trio in G for flute, bass clarinet, cello, 1984
The waters of the Light for two flutes in C, bass clarinet, violin and cello, 1989
Jumping transparent for piano, 1990
Music for the film Taumanía, 1987

References

Argentine classical composers
1940 births
Living people
Women classical composers
Argentine music educators
Argentine women educators
Musicians from Buenos Aires
20th-century Argentine women artists
21st-century Argentine women artists
20th-century classical composers
21st-century classical composers
Women music educators
20th-century women composers
21st-century women composers
Argentine women composers